Tseminyü District is the 13th district of the Indian state of Nagaland. It was created on December 18, 2021. The district headquarter is located in the town of Tseminyü. It is the homeland of the Rengma Nagas, with a population of 63,269 (2011) and an area of 256 square kilometres.

History 
Tseminyü District was created on December 18, 2021 as the 13th district of Nagaland. The new district has the same boundaries as the former Tseminyü sub-division of Kohima District.

Geography 
Tseminyü District covers an area of 256 km. The climate is sub-tropical with a monsoon season.

Administration 
The district covers two taluks (administrative circles), which are Tseminyü and Tsogin.

Tseminyü District contains one rural development blocks, which are Tseminyü and Tsogin.

Demographics 

According to the 2011 census of India the then Tseminyü circle of Kohima District had a population of 63,629. The majority of the inhabitants are the Rengma Nagas.

The total literacy rate of Niuland  is 81.71%. The Child sex ratio is 980 which is greater than the Average Sex Ratio of 1,011.

Religion 

According to the 2011 official census, Christianity is major religion in Tseminyu with small population of other religious minorities.

Towns and villages 
 the 2011 census the erstwhile sub-division held 39 villages, spread over two administrative circles as follows:
Tseminyü circle comprises the one town of Tseminyü (6,315), and the thirty-two villages of :
 Tesophenyü (11,116), Kandinu (3,938), Nsünyü (2,868), Tseminyü Vill. (2,863), Zisunyü (2,840), Phenshunyü (2,675), Sishunu (2,236), K. Station (2,169), Chunlikha (1,604), Terogunyü (1,559), Ziphenyü (1,495), Ehunnu (1,139), Kashanyü (833), Tseminyü South (765), Phenwhenyü (729), Rumensinyü (712), Khenyü (569), Sewanu (540), New Tesophenyü (516), Kashanyishi (428), Tsonsa (417), Ngvuphen (379), Gukhanyü (340), Yikhanu (331), Tseminyü Old Town (329), Henbenji (278), New Terogunyü (269), Khonibenzun (242), Likhwenchu (241), Guzinyü (222), Phenda (207), Zunpha Mission Centre (150).

Tsogin circle comprises seven villages :
 Sendenyü (2,548), New Sendenyü (730), Tsosinyü (696), Rengmapani (627), Thongsunyü (464), Longwesunyü (429), Tsogin HQ (31).

Transportation

Air 
The nearest airport is Dimapur Airport located about 100 kilometres from the district headquarters  at Tseminyü. The currently under construction airport at Kohima Chiethu Airport once completed will serve as the nearest airport to Tseminyü District.

Rail 
The nearest railway station is the Chümoukedima Shokhuvi Railway Station located 100 kilometres away from Tseminyü.

Road 

The NH 2  passes through the district.

See also 
 Nagaland

References 

Districts of Nagaland
2021 establishments in Nagaland